The 1936–37 Serie A season was the 11th season of the Serie A, the top level of ice hockey in Italy. Two teams participated in the league, and Hockey Club Milano won the championship.

Regular season

External links
 Season on hockeytime.net

1936–37 in Italian ice hockey
Serie A (ice hockey) seasons
Italy